Martyshkino is a historical part of the town of Lomonosov near St. Petersburg, Russia. It is located in the east of Lomonosov, not far from Petrodvorets. One of the first business parks in the St. Petersburg is built in the area.

Geography of Saint Petersburg
Petergofsky Uyezd